Eucereon aeolum is a moth of the subfamily Arctiinae. It was described by George Hampson in 1898. It is found in Mexico and Guatemala.

References

 

aeolum
Moths described in 1898